Skeemella clavula is an elongate animal from what is now the Middle Cambrian Wheeler Shale lagerstätte, of Utah. It has been classified with the vetulicolians. The genus shows typical vetulicolian features, such as a body divided into two distinct parts: a wider torpedo-shaped front end and a segmented rear section interpreted as the muscular driver for an active swimming lifestyle. Vetulicolians were originally described as relatives of arthropods, but their classification is debated; the discovery of new genera with a row of front-section openings interpreted as gill slits has shifted their interpretation to stem deuterostomes related to tunicates, or perhaps even crown-group chordates. Newer reconstructions of vetulicolians often resemble tunicate larvae or simple cephalochordates, with the front section as a pharynx used for breathing and ramjet style filter-feeding and the rear section as muscle blocks. However, Skeemella is an unlikely candidate for this interpretation; the rear section segments bear clear affinities to arthropods Either Skeemella is not a vetulicolian, researchers do not yet have enough data to correctly interpret Skeemella, or vetulicolians are not deuterosomes.

Skeemella was described in 2005 by a team led by Derek Briggs, an expert on Burgess Shale arthropods. It is diagnosed as having a body in two sections, covered in cuticle. The anterior section is short and wide, has a straight dorsal margin and a curving ventral margin, and is divided longitudinally in a way that makes it resemble a head shield. The anterior region is interpreted as being made of nine segments separated by thinner membranes (rather than as a single unit with multiple openings). Skeemella has a narrow, worm-shaped rear section with 43 segments in the preserved specimen, identified as tergites separated by flexible membranes. The rear section terminates in what appears to be an arthropod telson, an elongate, unsegmented flattened structure that ends in two backward-pointing spines.

The genus is known from only one specimen. It is one of a number of unrelated "platypus problems," early lagerstätten fossils that have seemed to mix features of chordates and arthropods, two animal clades considered most distant from each other. This issue has been resolved in other cases by the discovery of more specimens that better reveal the anatomy of the animal(s).

References 

Vetulicolia enigmatic taxa
Wheeler Shale